Giuliano Gemma (2 September 1938 – 1 October 2013) was an Italian actor. He is best known internationally for his work in Spaghetti Westerns, particularly for his performances as the title character in Duccio Tessari's A Pistol for Ringo (1965), Captain Montgomery Brown/'Ringo' in Tessari's The Return of Ringo (1965), the title character in Michele Lupo's Arizona Colt (1966), Scott Mary in Tonino Valerii's Day of Anger (1967) and Michael "California" Random in Lupo's California (1977).

Biography
Born in Rome, Gemma first worked as a stuntman, then was offered real acting parts by director Duccio Tessari, starting with the film Arrivano i titani (1962). He also made an appearance in Luchino Visconti's Il Gattopardo as Garibaldi's General. Gemma later went on to star in Spaghetti Westerns in films such as A Pistol for Ringo (Una pistola per Ringo), Blood for a Silver Dollar (Un dollaro bucato), Wanted and Day of Anger (I giorni dell'ira). He was sometimes credited as Montgomery Wood. Giuliano Gemma's career survived the demise of the genre, and he remained active on Italian television.

Gemma played in a variety of movies, including art-house offerings such as Valerio Zurlini's The Desert of the Tartars (Il deserto dei tartari) in 1976. The same year, Gemma won a David di Donatello, the Italian equivalent of the Oscar, for his portrayal of Major Matiss in The Desert of Tartars.

Gemma also starred in a web comic named "Man Born Again" (2012) by Eclypsed Word.

His daughter, Vera Gemma, is also an actress. Giuliano Gemma also worked as a sculptor.

On 1 October 2013, Gemma died following a car accident in Cerveteri, near Rome. He was taken to a hospital in Civitavecchia and pronounced dead shortly after his arrival. Two other passengers, a man and his son, were also injured in the accident.

Selected filmography

References

External links

1938 births
2013 deaths
Male Spaghetti Western actors
Italian male film actors
Italian male television actors
Male actors from Rome
20th-century Italian sculptors
20th-century Italian male artists
Italian male sculptors
Nastro d'Argento winners
Road incident deaths in Italy
Burials at the Cimitero Flaminio
People of Lazian descent